Dyschirius owen is a species of ground beetle in the subfamily Scaritinae. It was described by Dajoz in 2004.

References

owen
Beetles described in 2004